The Nicobar jungle flycatcher (Cyornis nicobaricus) is a species of bird in the Old World flycatcher family Muscicapidae.
It is endemic to the Nicobar Islands where its natural habitats are subtropical or tropical moist lowland forests and subtropical or tropical mangrove forests. It was at one time considered as a subspecies of the brown-chested jungle flycatcher.

This species was previously placed in the genus Rhinomyias but was moved to Cyornis based on the results of a 2010 molecular phylogenetic study.

References

Further reading
BirdLife Species Factsheet.
 Rasmussen, P.C., and J.C. Anderton. 2005. Birds of South Asia. The Ripley guide. Volume 2: attributes and status. Smithsonian Institution and Lynx Edicions, Washington D.C. and Barcelona.

Nicobar jungle flycatcher
Birds of the Nicobar Islands
Endemic fauna of the Nicobar Islands
Nicobar jungle flycatcher
Taxa named by Charles Wallace Richmond